The South African Railways Class 16A 4-6-2 of 1915 was a steam locomotive.

In 1915, the South African Railways placed two experimental four-cylinder simple expansion steam locomotives with a 4-6-2 Pacific type wheel arrangement in passenger train service. They were designated Class 16A.

Manufacturer
The Class 16A 4-6-2 Pacific type locomotive was designed by D.A. Hendrie, Chief Mechanical Engineer (CME) of the South African Railways (SAR) from 1910 to 1922, and was built in 1915 by the North British Locomotive Company (NBL) in Glasgow, Scotland. Two locomotives were delivered in November 1915, numbered 851 and 852.

Except that they had four cylinders instead of the usual two, they were identical in most respects to their predecessors, the Class 16, which were delivered by NBL a year earlier. They were also superheated, with Walschaerts valve gear and Belpaire fireboxes, and were also delivered with Type MP1 tenders with a  coal capacity and a  water capacity.

Four-cylinder experiment
With the Class 16A, Hendrie experimented with four-cylinder simple expansion (simplex) steam power. All four cylinders were arranged in line below the smokebox. The Walschaerts valve gear had rocker arms attached to the tail ends of the outer piston valves which passed through the frames and then actuated the adjacent inner piston's valves. It operated in the simplex configuration, whereby steam is fed directly to all four cylinders and spent steam is exhausted by all cylinders directly through the smokebox and up the chimney.

All four cylinders were the same size, with a  bore and  stroke, which presented a number of problems which had to be overcome to arrange two of these in the limited space between the frames. The outer cylinders drove the centre pair of coupled wheels, while the inner cylinders operated on a cranked leading coupled wheel axle. Each inside crank was arranged at an angle of 180 degrees with its adjacent outside crank.

The arrangement made for a very smooth-running locomotive capable of very fast running since the shouldering effect which occurs on two-cylinder locomotives was completely absent. They were very popular with their crews because of their smooth and steady running.

They did, however, have less tractive effort than the two-cylinder Class 16. Even though the Class 16A experiment was successful, the available space on a Cape gauge locomotive for four equal-sized in-line cylinders would prevent larger diameter cylinders from being fitted and the four-cylinder design was therefore never repeated by the SAR.

Service
The two locomotives were placed in service on the Reef where they operated with reasonable success. Their biggest disadvantage was the difficult access to the inner cylinders. The last of these locomotives was withdrawn from service and scrapped during 1944.

Illustration

References

1890
1890
4-6-2 locomotives
2′C1′ h4 locomotives
NBL locomotives
Cape gauge railway locomotives
Railway locomotives introduced in 1915
1915 in South Africa
Scrapped locomotives